Peggy Vrijens (born 28 October 1976) is a Dutch actress.

Career 

She played a role in the television series Rozengeur & Wodka Lime (2001 – 2002), Costa! (2005) and Voetbalvrouwen (2007 – 2010). She also played the role of Morgan le Fay in several episodes of the television series Het Huis Anubis en de Vijf van het Magische Zwaard (2011).

In 2005, she played the role of Joy in the film Joyride.

In 2006, she participated in the popular television show Wie is de Mol?. In 2020, she appeared in a special anniversary edition of the show, called Wie is de Mol? Renaissance, which featured only contestants of previous seasons.

She appeared in the 2021 film Liefde Zonder Grenzen.

Using motion capturing, the motions of the character Aloy in the game Horizon Forbidden West were acted by Vrijens.

Filmography

As actress 

 2005: Joyride
 2021: Liefde Zonder Grenzen

As contestant 

 2006: Wie is de Mol?
 2012: Expeditie Robinson
 2020: Wie is de Mol? Renaissance (anniversary season)

References

External links 
 

Living people
1976 births
Actors from Maastricht
Dutch film actresses
Dutch television actresses